Anne van Bonn (born 12 October 1985 in Geldern, North Rhine-Westphalia) is a German footballer.

Career
She currently plays for FCR 2001 Duisburg.

In 2011, she transferred to Lokomotive Leipzig.

Honours

FCR 2001 Duisburg 
Bundesliga: Runner-up (5) 2004–05, 2005–06, 2006–07, 2007–08, 2009–10
German Cup: Winner (2) 2008–09, 2009–10, Runner-up (1) 2006–07
UEFA Women's Cup: Winner (1) 2008–09

Germany 
FIFA U-19 Women's World Championship: Winner (1) 2004
UEFA Women's U-19 Championship: Runner-up (1) 2004

References

External links 
 
 
 

1985 births
Living people
People from Geldern
Sportspeople from Düsseldorf (region)
German women's footballers
FCR 2001 Duisburg players
1. FC Lokomotive Leipzig players
SC Sand players
Women's association football defenders
Footballers from North Rhine-Westphalia
Frauen-Bundesliga players